Doris A. Smith-Ribner is a former judge of the Pennsylvania Commonwealth Court.

She attended the University of Pittsburgh and the University of Pittsburgh School of Law, and was subsequently in private law practice in Allegheny County with her law partner, Byrd R. Brown. She served as solicitor for the Allegheny County Controller from 1980 to 1984. Smith-Ribner served as a judge of the Allegheny County Court of Common Pleas on an interim basis from 1984 to 1985. She was first elected to the Pennsylvania Commonwealth Court in 1987 and was re-elected in 1997 and 2007.  She retired from the court in 2009.

She was a candidate for the Democratic nomination for lieutenant governor in 2010.

Smith-Ribner and her husband, former Philadelphia Common Pleas Judge Paul Ribner, have one daughter.

See also
List of African-American jurists

References

Judges of the Commonwealth Court of Pennsylvania
University of Pittsburgh alumni
Judges of the Pennsylvania Courts of Common Pleas
Year of birth missing (living people)
Living people
University of Pittsburgh School of Law alumni